Priti Patkar is an Indian social worker and human rights activist. She is the co-founder and director of the organisation Prerana that has done pioneering work in the red-light districts of Mumbai, India to protect children vulnerable to commercial sexual exploitation and trafficking.

Personal life

Priti Patkar was born in Mumbai. Her father was a government servant and her mother ran a daycare program. She is a Gold Medalist from The Tata Institute of Social Sciences, Mumbai where she completed a Masters in Social Work. She is married to social activist Pravin Patkar.

Activism

Priti Patkar has been working for the protection and rescue of children and women victims of human trafficking and commercial sexual exploitation for over 30 years. She founded Prerana in 1986, after a research visit for her Masters in Social Work to the Kamathipura Red Light Area – where she witnessed three generations of women soliciting customers on the same street.

She is accredited with several path-breaking social interventions for the protection and dignity of children and women victims of human trafficking and commercial sexual exploitation.

Patkar has to her credit the largest number of legal interventions and writ petitions in India to protect the rights and dignity of child and female victims of child sexual exploitation and trafficking.

Selected awards

 Hirakani Puraskar, 2013 (Doordarshan – Sahyadri) 
 An award from the Government of Maharashtra where she was felicitated by the Chief Minister – Shri Prithviraj Chawan in March 2013.
Human Rights Award at the 2014 Vital Voices Global Leadership Awards 
Nari Shakti Puraskar, 2015. This award is given by the Union Ministry of Women and Child Development to institutions and individuals who have made exceptional contributions towards the empowerment of women specifically belonging to vulnerable and marginalized sectors of society.
Sofy India Women Award 2016

Research

Patkar has 7 books and several research reports to her name – published or released by The National Commission for Women, UNICEF, UNDP, USAID/FHI. Others have been sponsored by Groupe Development (France), Concern India Foundation, USAID, and more. Through Prerana, she has also been systematically mapping the decline of the Kamathipura Red Light Area since 2010.

References

External links
How Prerana’s Priti Patkar has changed the lives of sex workers' children – 2014 Guardian newspaper article
 Prerana Anti-Trafficking, Mumbai – official website
 Prerana - Lighting the Lamp of Self Esteem for the Children of Sex Workers – article at The Better India website
 Priti Patkar – archived profile from the Ashoka website
 Priti Patkar runs night shelters for children of sex workers – archived from IBN Live

Social workers
Indian women activists
Living people
Scientists from Mumbai
Indian women educational theorists
20th-century Indian educational theorists
Women educators from Maharashtra
20th-century Indian women scientists
Activists from Maharashtra
Women scientists from Maharashtra
Social workers from Maharashtra
Educators from Maharashtra
Year of birth missing (living people)
20th-century women educators